The 2017 San Francisco Giants season was the Giants' 135th  season in Major League Baseball, their Diamond Jubilee in San Francisco since their move from New York following the 1957 season, and their 18th at AT&T Park. They finished in last place in the National League West with a record of 64–98, the worst record in the National League, as well as their worst record as a team since 1985. The Giants tied with the Detroit Tigers for the worst record in MLB. Incidentally, both teams had competed in the 2012 World Series five years earlier, which the Giants won.

Offseason
 November 3, 2016 − The Giants exercised the 2017 contract option on LHP Matt Moore.
 December 2, 2016 − The Giants avoid arbitration with RHP Cory Gearrin and IF Ehíré Adríanza, agreeing to one-year deals.
 December 2, 2016 − The Giants tendered the 2017 contracts on RHP George Kontos, IF Conor Gillaspie, 3B Eduardo Núñez and LHP Will Smith.
 December 2, 2016 − The Giants signed RHP Mark Melancon to a four-year, $62 million contract.
 December 7, 2016 − The Giants traded RHP Chris Heston to Seattle Mariners for a player to be named later.
 January 11, 2017 − The Giants avoid arbitration with 3B Conor Gillaspie agreeing to one-year deals.
 January 13, 2017 − The Giants avoid arbitration with LHP Will Smith, RHP George Kontos and 3B Eduardo Núñez agreeing to one-year deals.
 January 23, 2017 − The Giants agreed to terms with Korean infielder Jae-gyun Hwang.
 January 24, 2017 − The Giants signed C Nick Hundley to a one-year deal.

Preseason predictions
Preseason predictions for the Giants were generally positive. Ahead of spring training, Sports Illustrated ranked the Giants 10th out of 30 teams in their preseason power rankings, saying that if the bullpen improves as expected, "there's enough talent here for the Giants to crash the playoffs yet again, despite a very quiet off-season outside of the Melancon deal". Before the first regular-season game of the year, FanGraphs projected that the Giants would win 88 games, giving the team an 18% chance of winning the division and a 66% chance of making the playoffs.

Events
 April 2, 2017 – LHP Will Smith is placed on the 60-day disabled list after undergoing Tommy John surgery.
 April 11, 2017 – C Buster Posey is placed on the 7-day concussion disabled list after being hit in the head by a pitch from Taijuan Walker.
 April 16, 2017 – OF Jarrett Parker is placed on the 10-day disabled list after breaking his clavicle while crashing into the outfield wall making a catch.
 April 21, 2017 – LHP Madison Bumgarner is placed on the 10-day disabled list for the first time in his career after sustaining rib and shoulder injuries from a dirt bike accident.
 April 24, 2017 – The Giants purchase the contract of top position prospect IF Christian Arroyo and subsequently promote him to the active roster.
 April 26, 2017 – OF Denard Span is placed on the 10-day disabled list.
 April 26, 2017 – OF Jarrett Parker is transferred to the 60-day disabled list.
 April 29, 2017 – SS Brandon Crawford is placed on the 10-day disabled list with a groin injury.
 May 9, 2017 – RHP Mark Melancon is placed on the 10-day disabled list with a forearm injury.
 May 15, 2017 – OF Hunter Pence is placed on the 10-day disabled list with a hamstring injury.
 June 6, 2017 – The Giants acquire RHP Sam Dyson and cash considerations in a trade with the Texas Rangers in exchange for a player to be named later or cash considerations.
 June 6, 2017 – LHP Madison Bumgarner is transferred to the 60-day disabled list.
 June 23, 2017 – 3B Eduardo Núñez is placed on the 10-day disabled list with a hamstring injury.
 July 2, 2017 – The rosters for the 2017 Major League Baseball All-Star Game are announced, with C Buster Posey being named the National League's starter at catcher and to the all-star game for the fifth time.
 July 3, 2017 – The Giants acquire RHP Tyler Herb from the Seattle Mariners in exchange for cash considerations.
 July 25, 2017 – The Giants acquire minor league RHP Shaun Anderson and Gregory Santos from the Boston Red Sox in exchange for IF Eduardo Núñez.
 August 20, 2017 – With six weeks left of the season, the Giants become the first team to be eliminated from a division race, following a 5–2 loss to the Philadelphia Phillies.

Season standings

National League West

National League Division Standings

Record vs. opponents

Game log and schedule

All schedule and scores taken from MLB.com.

|- style="text-align:center" style="background-color: #fbb;"
| 1 || April 2 || @ Diamondbacks || 5–6 || Rodney (1–0)  || Melancon (0–1) || — || 49,016 || 0–1 
|- style="text-align:center" style="background-color:#bfb;"
| 2 || April 4 || @ Diamondbacks || 8–4 || Cueto (1–0) || Corbin (0–1) || — || 19,378 || 1–1
|- style="text-align:center" style="background-color:#fbb;"
| 3 || April 5 || @ Diamondbacks || 6–8 || Walker (1–0) || Moore (0–1) || Rodney (1) || 14,675 || 1–2
|- style="text-align:center" style="background-color:#fbb;"
| 4 || April 6 || @ Diamondbacks || 3–9 || De La Rosa (1–0) || Samardzija (0–1) || — || 15,308 || 1–3
|- style="text-align:center" style="background-color:#fbb;"
| 5 || April 7 || @ Padres || 6–7 || Torres (1–0) || Kontos (0–1) || Maurer (1) || 43,441 || 1–4 
|- style="text-align:center" style="background-color:#fbb;"
| 6 || April 8 || @ Padres || 1–2 || Chacín (1–1) || Bumgarner (0–1) || Buchter (1) || 42,397 || 1–5
|- style="text-align:center" style="background-color:#bfb;"
| 7 || April 9 || @ Padres || 5–3 || Cueto (2–0) || Richard (1–1) || Melancon (1) || 40,537 || 2–5
|- style="text-align:center" style="background-color:#bfb;"
| 8 || April 10 || Diamondbacks || 4–1 || Moore (1–1) || Walker (1–1) || Melancon (2) || 42,129 || 3–5
|- style="text-align:center" style="background-color:#fbb;"
| 9 || April 11 || Diamondbacks || 3–4 || Ray (1–0) || Samardzija (0–2) || Rodney (3) || 41,562 || 3–6
|- style="text-align:center" style="background-color:#bfb;"
| 10 || April 12 || Diamondbacks || 6–2 || Cain (1–0) || Miller (1–1) || — || 41,656 || 4–6
|- style="text-align:center" style="background-color:#fbb;"
| 11 || April 13 || Rockies || 1–3 || Rusin (1–0) || Bumgarner (0–2) || Holland (6) || 41,915 || 4–7
|- style="text-align:center" style="background-color:#bfb;"
| 12 || April 14 || Rockies || 8–2 || Cueto (3–0) || Anderson (1–2) || — || 42,738 || 5–7
|- style="text-align:center" style="background-color:#fbb;"
| 13 || April 15 || Rockies || 0–5 || Chatwood (1–2) || Moore (1–2) || — || 42,371 || 5–8
|- style="text-align:center" style="background-color:#fbb;"
| 14 || April 16 || Rockies || 3–4 || Senzatela (2–0) || Samardzija (0–3) || Holland (7) || 41,455 || 5–9
|- style="text-align:center" style="background-color:#bfb;"
| 15 || April 18 || @ Royals || 2–1  || Law (1–0) || Alexander (0–1) || Melancon (3) || 20,863 || 6–9
|- style="text-align:center" style="background-color:#fbb;"
| 16 || April 19 || @ Royals || 0–2 || Vargas (3–0) || Bumgarner (0–3) || Herrera (3) || 24,402 || 6–10
|- style="text-align:center" style="background-color:#fbb;"
| 17 || April 21 || @ Rockies || 5–6 || Chatwood (2–2) || Cueto (3–1) || Holland (9) || 27,663 || 6–11
|- style="text-align:center" style="background-color:#fbb;"
| 18 || April 22 || @ Rockies || 3–12 || Senzatela (3–0) || Moore (1–3) || — || 39,239 || 6–12
|- style="text-align:center" style="background-color:#fbb;"
| 19 || April 23 || @ Rockies || 0–8 || Freeland (2–1) || Samardzija (0–4) || — || 42,011 || 6–13
|- style="text-align:center" style="background-color:#bfb;"
| 20 || April 24 || Dodgers || 2–1 || Cain (2–0) || Ryu (0–4) || Melancon (4) || 41,399 || 7–13
|- style="text-align:center" style="background-color:#fbb;"
| 21 || April 25 || Dodgers || 1–2 || Kershaw (4–1) || Blach (0–1) || Jansen (5) || 41,329 ||7–14
|- style="text-align:center"  style="background-color:#bfb;"
| 22 || April 26 || Dodgers || 4–3  || Law (2–0) || Stripling (0–2) || — || 41,573 || 8–14
|- style="text-align:center" style="background-color:#fbb;"
| 23 || April 27 || Dodgers || 1–5  || Jansen (1–0) || Gearrin (0–1) || — || 41,580 || 8–15
|- style="text-align:center" style="background-color:#bfb;"
| 24 || April 28 || Padres || 4–3 || Law (3–0) || Buchter (1–1) || Melancon (5) || 41,436 || 9–15
|- style="text-align:center" style="background-color:#fbb;"
| 25 || April 29 || Padres || 4–12 || Chacín (3–3) || Stratton (0–1) || — || 42,862 || 9–16
|- style="text-align:center" style="background-color:#fbb;"
| 26 || April 30 || Padres || 2–5  || Buchter (2–1) || Kontos (0–1) || Torres (1) || 41,989 || 9–17
|-

|- style="text-align:center" style="background-color:#bfb;"
| 27 || May 1 || @ Dodgers || 4–3 || Cueto (4–1) || Kershaw (4–2) || Law (1) || 44,606 || 10–17
|- style="text-align:center" style="background-color:#fbb;"
| 28 || May 2 || @ Dodgers || 5–13 || Wood (2–0) || Moore (1–4) || — || 43,471 || 10–18
|- style="text-align:center" style="background-color:#bfb;"
| 29 || May 3 || @ Dodgers || 4–1  || Okert (1–0) || Dayton (1–1) || Melancon (6) || 50,215 || 11–18
|- style="text-align:center" style="background-color:#fbb;"
| 30 || May 5 || @ Reds || 3–13 || Arroyo (3–2) || Cain (2–1) || — || 22,724 || 11–19
|- style="text-align:center" style="background-color:#fbb;"
| 31 || May 6 || @ Reds || 2–14 || Garrett (3–2) || Blach (0–2) || Stephenson (1) || 20,213 || 11–20
|- style="text-align:center" style="background-color:#fbb;"
| 32 || May 7 || @ Reds || 0–4 || Feldman (2–3) || Cueto (4–2) || — || 21,142 || 11–21
|- style="text-align:center" style="background-color:#fbb;"
| 33 || May 8 || @ Mets || 3–4 || Familia (1–0) || Osich (0–1) || — || 28,453 || 11–22
|- style="text-align:center" style="background-color:#fbb;"
| 34 || May 9 || @ Mets || 1–6 || Wheeler (2–2) || Samardzija (0–5) || — || 29,030 || 11–23
|- style="text-align:center" style="background-color:#bfb;"
| 35 || May 10 || @ Mets || 6–5 || Morris (1–0) || Familia (1–1) || Law (2) || 31,066 || 12–23
|- style="text-align:center" style="background-color:#fbb;"
| 36 || May 11 || Reds || 2–3 || Peralta (2–0) || Strickland (0–1) || Iglesias (7) || 41,193 || 12–24
|- style="text-align:center" style="background-color:#bfb;"
| 37 || May 12 || Reds || 3–2  || Gearrin (1–1) || Stephenson (0–2) || — || 41,325 || 13–24
|- style="text-align:center" style="background-color:#bfb;"
| 38 || May 13 || Reds || 3–1 || Moore (2–4) || Bonilla (0–1) || Law (3) || 41,269 || 14–24
|- style="text-align:center" style="background-color:#bfb;"
| 39 || May 14 || Reds || 8–3 || Samardzija (1–5) || Adleman (2–2) || — || 42,122 || 15–24
|- style="text-align:center" style="background-color:#bfb;"
| 40 || May 15 || Dodgers || 8–4 || Cain (3–1) || McCarthy (3–1) || — || 41,397 || 16–24
|- style="text-align:center" style="background-color:#bfb;"
| 41 || May 16 || Dodgers || 2–1 || Blach (1–2) || Avilán (0–1) || Law (4) || 41,366 || 17–24
|- style="text-align:center" style="background-color:#fbb;"
| 42 || May 17 || Dodgers || 1–6 || Kershaw (7–2) || Cueto (4–3) || — || 41,588 || 17–25
|- style="text-align:center" style="background-color:#bfb;"
| 43 || May 19 || @ Cardinals || 6–5 || Morris (2–0) || Oh (1–2) || Melancon (7) || 44,548 || 18–25
|- style="text-align:center" style="background-color:#bfb;"
| 44 || May 20 || @ Cardinals || 3–1  || Strickland (1–1) || Siegrist (0–1) || Melancon (8) || 45,072 || 19–25
|- style="text-align:center" style="background-color:#fbb;"
| 45 || May 21 || @ Cardinals || 3–8 || Wainwright (4–3) || Cain (3–2) || — || 47,533 || 19–26
|- style="text-align:center" style="background-color:#bfb;"
| 46 || May 22 || @ Cubs || 6–4 || Blach (2–2) || Lackey (4–4) || Melancon (9) || 36,204 || 20–26
|- style="text-align:center" style="background-color:#fbb;"
| 47 || May 23 || @ Cubs || 1–4 || Lester (3–2) || Cueto (4–4) || — || 32,905 || 20–27
|- style="text-align:center" style="background-color:#fbb;"
| 48 || May 24 || @ Cubs || 4–5 || Hendricks (4–2) || Moore (2–5) || Davis (10) || 35,617 || 20–28
|- style="text-align:center" style="background-color:#fbb;"
| 49 || May 25 || @ Cubs || 1–5 || Butler (2–0) || Samardzija (1–6) || Montgomery (1) || 37,513 || 20–29
|- style="text-align:center" style="background-color:#fbb;"
| 50 || May 26 || Braves || 0–2 || García (2–3) || Cain (3–3) || Johnson (10) || 41,326 || 20–30
|- style="text-align:center" style="background-color:#bfb;"
| 51 || May 27 || Braves || 6–3 || Blach (3–2) || Foltynewicz (3–5) || Melancon (10) || 41,355 || 21–30
|- style="text-align:center" style="background-color:#bfb;"
| 52 || May 28 || Braves || 7–1 || Cueto (5–4) || Dickey (3–4) || — || 42,343 || 22–30
|- style="text-align:center" style="background-color:#fbb;"
| 53 || May 29 || Nationals || 0–3 || Roark (5–2) || Moore (2–6) || Glover (6) || 41,969 || 22–31
|- style="text-align:center" style="background-color:#fbb;"
| 54 || May 30 || Nationals || 3–6 || González (4–1) || Samardzija (1–7) || Glover (7) || 41,266 || 22–32
|- style="text-align:center" style="background-color:#fbb;"
| 55 || May 31 || Nationals || 1–3 || Scherzer (6–3) || Cain (3–4) || — || 41,371 || 22–33
|-

|- style="text-align:center" style="background-color:#bfb;"
| 56 || June 2 || @ Phillies || 10–0 || Blach (4–2) || Eickhoff (0–6) || — || 22,491 || 23–33
|- style="text-align:center" style="background-color:#fbb;"
| 57 || June 3 || @ Phillies || 3–5 || Lively (1–0) || Cueto (5–5) || Gómez (2) || 32,413 || 23–34
|- style="text-align:center" style="background-color:#fbb;"
| 58 || June 4 || @ Phillies || 7–9 || Neshek (1–1) || Law (3–1) || Neris (5) || 25,063 || 23–35
|- style="text-align:center" style="background-color:#bfb;"
| 59 || June 5 || @ Brewers || 7–2 || Samardzija (2–7) || Scahill (1–2) || — || 21,452 || 24–35
|- style="text-align:center" style="background-color:#fbb;"
| 60 || June 6 || @ Brewers || 2–5 || Anderson (5–1) || Cain (3–5) || Knebel (6) || 21,214 || 24–36
|- style="text-align:center" style="background-color:#fbb;"
| 61 || June 7 || @ Brewers || 3–6 || Nelson (4–3) || Blach (4–3) || Knebel (7) || 20,580 || 24–37
|- style="text-align:center" style="background-color:#bfb;"
| 62 || June 8 || @ Brewers || 9–5  || Melancon (1–1) || Barnes (1–1) || — || 23,005 || 25–37
|- style="text-align:center" style="background-color:#fbb;"
| 63 || June 9 || Twins || 0–4 || Santana (8–3) || Moore (2–7) || — || 41,046 || 25–38
|- style="text-align:center" style="background-color:#fbb;"
| 64 || June 10 || Twins || 2–3 || Berríos (5–1) || Samardzija (2–8) || Kintzler (17) || 41,255 || 25–39
|- style="text-align:center" style="background-color:#bfb;"
| 65 || June 11 || Twins || 13–8 || Osich (1–1) || Belisle (0–1) || — || 41,321 || 26–39
|- style="text-align:center" style="background-color:#fbb;"
| 66 || June 13 || Royals || 1–8 || Vargas (9–3) || Blach (4–4) || — || 41,284 || 26–40
|- style="text-align:center" style="background-color:#fbb;"
| 67 || June 14 || Royals || 2–7 || Hammel (3–6) || Cueto (5–6) || — || 41,144 || 26–41
|- style="text-align:center" style="background-color:#fbb;"
| 68 || June 15 || @ Rockies || 9–10 || Holland (1–0) || Strickland (1–2) || — || 40,747 || 26–42
|- style="text-align:center" style="background-color:#fbb;"
| 69 || June 16 || @ Rockies || 8–10 || Senzatela (9–2) || Samardzija (2–9) || Holland (24) || 46,632 || 26–43
|- style="text-align:center" style="background-color:#fbb;"
| 70 || June 17 || @ Rockies || 1–5 || Freeland (8–4) || Cain (3–6) || — || 48,035 || 26–44
|- style="text-align:center" style="background-color:#fbb;"
| 71 || June 18 || @ Rockies || 5–7 || Estévez (4–0) || Melancon (1–2) || — || 48,341 || 26–45
|- style="text-align:center" style="background-color:#fbb;"
| 72 || June 19 || @ Braves || 0–9 || Dickey (5–5) || Cueto (5–7) || — || 24,723 || 26–46
|- style="text-align:center" style="background-color:#bfb;"
| 73 || June 20 || @ Braves || 6–3 || Moore (3–7) || Teherán (6–5) || Melancon (11) || 23,823 || 27–46
|- style="text-align:center" style="background-color:#fbb;"
| 74 || June 21 || @ Braves || 3–5  || Jackson (2–0) || Gearrin (1–2) || — || 25,771 || 27–47
|- style="text-align:center" style="background-color:#fbb;"
| 75 || June 22 || @ Braves || 11–12 || Hursh (1–0) || Cain (3–7) || Johnson (14) || 25,521 || 27–48
|- style="text-align:center" style="background-color:#fbb;"
| 76 || June 23 || Mets || 4–11 || Lugo (2–1) || Blach (4–5) || — || 41,769 || 27–49
|- style="text-align:center" style="background-color:#fbb;"
| 77 || June 24 || Mets || 2–5 || deGrom (7–3) || Dyson (0–1) || — || 41,216  || 27–50
|- style="text-align:center" style="background-color:#fbb;"
| 78 || June 25 || Mets || 2–8 || Montero (1–4) || Moore (3–8) || — || 41,137 || 27–51
|- style="text-align:center" style="background-color:#bfb;"
| 79 || June 26 || Rockies || 9–2 || Samardzija (3–9) || Márquez (5–4) || — || 41,388 || 28–51
|- style="text-align:center" style="background-color:#bfb;"
| 80 || June 27 || Rockies || 4–3  || Gearrin (2–2) || Qualls (1–1) || — || 41,331 || 29–51
|- style="text-align:center" style="background-color:#bfb;"
| 81 || June 28 || Rockies || 5–3 || Blach (5–5) || Freeland (8–6) || Strickland (1) || 41,286 || 30–51
|- style="text-align:center" style="background-color:#bfb;"
| 82 || June 30 || @ Pirates || 13–5 || Cueto (6–7) || Cole (6–7) || — || 26,407 || 31–51 
|-

|- style="text-align:center" style="background-color:#bfb;"
| 83 || July 1 || @ Pirates || 2–1  || Osich (2–1) || Hudson (1–4) || Dyson (1) || 27,247 || 32–51
|- style="text-align:center" style="background-color:#bfb;"
| 84 || July 2 || @ Pirates || 5–3 || Samardzija (4–9) || Watson (4–2) || Dyson (2) || 32,144 || 33–51
|- style="text-align:center" style="background-color:#fbb;"
| 85 || July 4 || @ Tigers || 3–5 || Fulmer (8–6) || Cain (3–8) || Wilson (9) || 32,514 || 33–52
|- style="text-align:center" style="background-color:#bfb;"
| 86 || July 5 || @ Tigers || 5–4 || Blach (6–5) || Norris (4–7) || Dyson (3) || 26,631 || 34–52
|- style="text-align:center" style="background-color:#fbb;"
| 87 || July 6 || @ Tigers || 2–6 || Sánchez (1–0) || Stratton (0–2) || — || 27,210 || 34–53
|- style="text-align:center" style="background-color:#fbb;"
| 88 || July 7 || Marlins || 1–6 || Straily (7–4) || Moore (3–9) || — || 41,510 || 34–54
|- style="text-align:center" style="background-color:#fbb;"
| 89 || July 8 || Marlins || 4–5 || O'Grady (1–0) || Samardzija (4–10) || Ramos (16) || 41,480 || 34–55
|- style="text-align:center" style="background-color:#fbb;"
| 90 || July 9 || Marlins || 8–10  || Wittgren (2–1) || Kontos (0–3) || Ramos (17) || 41,516 || 34–56
|- style="text-align:center; background:#bbcaff;"
| – || July 11 || colspan="7" | 88th All-Star Game in Miami, Florida
|- style="text-align:center" style="background-color:#bfb;"
| 91 || July 14 || @ Padres || 5–4 || Gearrin (3–2) || Richard (5–9) || Dyson (4) || 34,970 || 35–56
|- style="text-align:center" style="background-color:#fbb;"
| 92 || July 15 || @ Padres || 3–5 || Maurer (1–4) || Gearrin (3–3) || — || 36,266 || 35–57
|- style="text-align:center" style="background-color:#fbb;"
| 93 || July 16 || @ Padres || 1–7 || Cahill (4–3) || Samardzija (4–11) || — || 30,561 || 35–58
|- style="text-align:center" style="background-color:#fbb;"
| 94 || July 17 || Indians || 3–5 || Tomlin (6–9) || Moore (3–10) || Allen (17) || 39,538 || 35–59
|- style="text-align:center" style="background-color:#bfb;"
| 95 || July 18 || Indians || 2–1  || Dyson (1–1) || Allen (0–5) || — || 39,151 || 36–59
|- style="text-align:center" style="background-color:#bfb;"
| 96 || July 19 || Indians || 5–4 || Gearrin (4–3) || Shaw (2–4) || Dyson (5) || 41,067 || 37–59
|- style="text-align:center" style="background-color:#fbb;"
| 97 || July 20 || Padres || 2–5 || Chacín (9–7) || Bumgarner (0–4) || Maurer (20) || 41,166 || 37–60
|- style="text-align:center" style="background-color:#fbb;"
| 98 || July 21 || Padres || 9–12  || Maton (2–0) || Kontos (0–4) || — || 41,145 || 37–61
|- style="text-align:center" style="background-color:#bfb;"
| 99 || July 22 || Padres || 5–4  || Osich (3–1) || Quackenbush (0–2) || — || 40,936 || 38–61
|- style="text-align:center" style="background-color:#fbb;"
| 100 || July 23 || Padres || 2–5 || Lamet (4–4) || Blach (6–6) || Hand (3) || 41,372 || 38–62
|- style="text-align:center" style="background-color:#fbb;"
| 101 || July 24 || Pirates || 3–10 || Cole (8–7) || Cain (3–9) || — || 40,030 || 38–63
|- style="text-align:center" style="background-color:#bfb;"
| 102 || July 25 || Pirates || 11–3 || Bumgarner (1–4) || Taillon (6–4) || Stratton (1) || 41,232 || 39–63
|- style="text-align:center" style="background-color:#bfb;"
| 103 || July 26 || Pirates || 2–1 || Samardzija (5–11) || Watson (5–3) || Dyson (6) || 41,038 || 40–63
|- style="text-align:center" style="background-color:#fbb;"
| 104 || July 28 || @ Dodgers || 4–6 || Wood (12–1) || Kontos (0–5) || Jansen (26) || 51,426 || 40–64
|- style="text-align:center" style="background-color:#fbb;"
| 105 || July 29 || @ Dodgers || 1–2 || Hill (8–4) || Blach (6–7) || Jansen (27) || 47,792 || 40–65
|- style="text-align:center" style="background-color:#fbb;"
| 106 || July 30 || @ Dodgers || 2–3  || Báez (3–1) || Suárez (0–1) || — || 53,495 || 40–66
|- style="text-align:center" style="background-color:#fbb;"
| 107 || July 31 || @ Athletics || 5–8 || Blackburn (2–1) || Osich (3–2) || Treinen (1) || 38,391 || 40–67
|-

|- style="text-align:center" style="background-color:#bfb;"
| 108 || August 1 || @ Athletics || 10–4 || Samardzija (6–11) || Manaea (8–6) || — || 38,871 || 41–67
|- style="text-align:center" style="background-color:#fbb;"
| 109 || August 2 || Athletics || 1–6 || Gossett (3–6) || Moore (3–11) || — || 40,635 || 41–68
|- style="text-align:center" style="background-color:#bfb;"
| 110 || August 3 || Athletics || 11–2 || Blach (7–7) || Graveman (2–3) || — || 39,883 || 42–68
|- style="text-align:center" style="background-color:#fbb;"
| 111 || August 4 || Diamondbacks || 1–2 || Banda (1–1) || Bumgarner (1–5) || Rodney (25) || 38,967 || 42–69
|- style="text-align:center" style="background-color:#bfb;"
| 112 || August 5 || Diamondbacks || 5–4  || Strickland (2–2) || McFarland (4–4) || — || 39,532 || 43–69
|- style="text-align:center" style="background-color:#bfb;"
| 113 || August 6 || Diamondbacks || 6–3 || Samardzija (7–11) || Corbin (8–11) || Suárez (1) || 40,107 || 44–69
|- style="text-align:center" style="background-color:#fbb;"
| 114 || August 7 || Cubs || 3–5 || Arrieta (11–8) || Moore (3–12) || Davis (24) || 40,462 || 44–70
|- style="text-align:center" style="background-color:#bfb;"
| 115 || August 8 || Cubs || 6–3 || Blach (8–7) || Quintana (2–2) || Dyson (7) || 39,864 || 45–70
|- style="text-align:center" style="background-color:#bfb;"
| 116 || August 9 || Cubs || 3–1 || Bumgarner (2–5) || Duensing (0–1) || Dyson (8) || 41,099 || 46–70
|- style="text-align:center" style="background-color:#bbb;"
| – || August 11 || @ Nationals || colspan=7|Postponed (rain); Rescheduled for August 13 as part of a doubleheader.
|- style="text-align:center" style="background-color:#fbb;"
| 117 || August 12 || @ Nationals || 1–3 || Jackson (3–2) || Samardzija (7–12) || Doolittle (8) || 32,344 || 46–71
|- style="text-align:center" style="background-color:#bfb;"
| 118 || August 13 (1) || @ Nationals || 4–2 || Stratton (1–2) || Cole (1–3) || Dyson (9) || 30,866 || 47–71
|- style="text-align:center" style="background-color:#fbb;"
| 119 || August 13 (2) || @ Nationals || 2–6  || Albers (6–2) || Suárez (0–2) || — || 29,085 || 47–72
|- style="text-align:center" style="background-color:#fbb;"
| 120 || August 14 || @ Marlins || 3–8 || Conley (5–5) || Blach (8–8) || — || 17,096 || 47–73
|- style="text-align:center" style="background-color:#bfb;"
| 121 || August 15 || @ Marlins || 9–4 || Bumgarner (3–5) || Tazawa (2–3) || — || 21,694 || 48–73
|- style="text-align:center" style="background-color:#fbb;"
| 122 || August 16 || @ Marlins || 1–8 || Ureña (11–5) || Cain (3–10) || — || 17,102 || 48–74
|- style="text-align:center" style="background-color:#bfb;"
| 123 || August 17 || Phillies || 5–4 || Samardzija (8–12) || Nola (9–8) || Dyson (10) || 41,279 || 49–74
|- style="text-align:center" style="background-color:#bfb;"
| 124 || August 18 || Phillies || 10–2 || Moore (4–12) || Eflin (1–5) || — || 39,487 || 50–74
|- style="text-align:center" style="background-color:#fbb;"
| 125 || August 19 || Phillies || 9–12 || Morgan (1–1) || Osich (3–3) || Neris (14) || 40,719 || 50–75
|- style="text-align:center" style="background-color:#fbb;"
| 126 || August 20 || Phillies || 2–5 || Morgan (2–1) || Strickland (2–3) || Neris (15) || 39,921 || 50–76
|- style="text-align:center" style="background-color:#bfb;"
| 127 || August 21 || Brewers || 2–0 || Stratton (2–2) || Davies (14–7) || Dyson (11) || 39,341 || 51–76
|- style="text-align:center" style="background-color:#fbb;"
| 128 || August 22 || Brewers || 3–4 || Jeffress (1–0) || Suárez (0–3) || Knebel (27) || 39,523 || 51–77
|- style="text-align:center" style="background-color:#bfb;"
| 129 || August 23 || Brewers || 4–2 || Strickland (3–3) || Barnes (3–4) || Dyson (12) || 40,015 || 52–77
|- style="text-align:center" style="background-color:#fbb;"
| 130 || August 25 || @ Diamondbacks || 3–4 || Greinke (15–6) || Blach (8–10) || Rodney (31) || 31,924 || 52–78
|- style="text-align:center" style="background-color:#fbb;"
| 131 || August 26 || @ Diamondbacks || 1–2 || Walker (7–7) || Bumgarner (3–6) || Rodney (32) || 25,709 || 52–79
|- style="text-align:center" style="background-color:#fbb;"
| 132 || August 27 || @ Diamondbacks || 0–11 || Corbin (12–11) || Stratton (2–3) || — || 23,210 || 52–80
|- style="text-align:center" style="background-color:#bfb;"
| 133 || August 28 || @ Padres || 3–0 || Samardzija (9–12) || Chacín (11–10) || — || 20,594 || 53–80
|- style="text-align:center" style="background-color:#fbb;"
| 134 || August 29 || @ Padres || 3–6 || Perdomo (7–8) || Moore (4–13) || Hand (13) || 19,631 || 53–81
|- style="text-align:center" style="background-color:#fbb;"
| 135 || August 30 || @ Padres || 0–5 || Stammen (2–2) || Blach (8–11) || Hand (14) || 19,691 || 53–82
|- style="text-align:center" style="background-color:#fbb;"
| 136 || August 31 || Cardinals || 2–5 || Wacha (10–7) || Cain (3–11) || Oh (20) || 40,783 || 53–83
|-

|- style="text-align:center" style="background-color:#fbb;"
| 137 || September 1 || Cardinals || 6–11 || Lyons (3–0) || Dyson (1–2) || — || 37,797 || 53–84
|- style="text-align:center" style="background-color:#bfb;"
| 138 || September 2 || Cardinals || 2–1  || Dyson (2–2) || Sherriff (0–1) || — || 39,513 || 54–84
|- style="text-align:center" style="background-color:#fbb;"
| 139 || September 3 || Cardinals || 3–7 || Weaver (4–1) || Bumgarner (3–7) || — || 39,784 || 54–85
|- style="text-align:center" style="background-color:#fbb;"
| 140 || September 4 || @ Rockies || 3–4 || Holland (3–5) || Okert (1–1) || — || 28,300 || 54–86
|- style="text-align:center" style="background-color:#fbb;"
| 141 || September 5 || @ Rockies || 6–9 || Rusin (4–0) || Blach (8–12) || Holland (37) || 24,245 || 54–87
|- style="text-align:center" style="background-color:#bfb;"
| 142 || September 6 || @ Rockies || 11–3 || Cueto (7–7) || Freeland (11–10) || — || 26,674 || 55–87
|- style="text-align:center" style="background-color:#bfb;"
| 143 || September 8 || @ White Sox || 9–2 || Moore (5–13) || Giolito (2–2) || — || 16,852 || 56–87
|- style="text-align:center" style="background-color:#fbb;"
| 144 || September 9 || @ White Sox || 1–13 || Shields (3–6) || Samardzija (9–13) || — || 17,688 || 56–88
|- style="text-align:center" style="background-color:#fbb;"
| 145 || September 10 || @ White Sox || 1–8 || Fulmer (2–1) || Bumgarner (3–8) || — || 16,458 || 56–89
|- style="text-align:center" style="background-color:#bfb;"
| 146 || September 11 || Dodgers || 8–6 || Law (4–1) || Báez (3–5) || Dyson (13) || 40,409 || 57–89
|- style="text-align:center" style="background-color:#fbb;"
| 147 || September 12 || Dodgers || 3–5 || Kershaw (17–3) || Cueto (7–8) || Jansen (37) || 38,727 || 57–90
|- style="text-align:center" style="background-color:#fbb;"
| 148 || September 13 || Dodgers || 1–4 || Darvish (3–3) || Moore (5–14) || — || 38,866 || 57–91
|- style="text-align:center" style="background-color:#fbb;"
| 149 || September 15 || Diamondbacks || 2–3 || Ray (14–5) || Samardzija (9–14) || Rodney (37) || 39,810 || 57–92
|- style="text-align:center" style="background-color:#fbb;"
| 150 || September 16 || Diamondbacks || 0–2 || Greinke (17–6) || Bumgarner (3–9) || Rodney (38) || 37,846 || 57–93
|- style="text-align:center" style="background-color:#bfb;"
| 151 || September 17 || Diamondbacks || 7–2 || Stratton (3–3) || Walker (9–8) || — || 38,476 || 58–93
|- style="text-align:center" style="background-color:#bfb;"
| 152 || September 19 || Rockies || 4–3 || Dyson (3–2) || Rusin (5–1) || — || 40,686 || 59–93
|- style="text-align:center" style="background-color:#bfb;"
| 153 || September 20 || Rockies || 4–0 || Moore (6–14) || Chatwood (8–13) || — || 39,775 || 60–93
|- style="text-align:center" style="background-color:#fbb;"
| 154 || September 22 || @ Dodgers || 2–4 || Hill (5–1) || Samardzija (9–15) || Jansen (40) || 51,159 || 60–94
|- style="text-align:center" style="background-color:#bfb;"
| 155 || September 23 || @ Dodgers || 2–1 || Bumgarner (4–9) || Ryu (5–8) || Dyson (14) || 51,093 || 61–94
|- style="text-align:center" style="background-color:#fbb;"
| 156 || September 24 || @ Dodgers || 1–3 || Kershaw (18–4) || Stratton (3–4) || Morrow (2) || 46,774 || 61–95
|- style="text-align:center" style="background-color:#bfb;"
| 157 || September 25 || @ Diamondbacks || 9–2 || Cueto (8–8) || Godley (8–9) || — || 22,813 || 62–95
|- style="text-align:center" style="background-color:#fbb;"
| 158 || September 26 || @ Diamondbacks || 4–11 || Ray (15–5) || Moore (6–15) || — || 27,487 || 62–96
|- style="text-align:center" style="background-color:#fbb;"
| 159 || September 27 || @ Diamondbacks || 3–4 || Hoover (3–1) || Dyson (3–3) || — || 20,048 || 62–97
|- style="text-align:center" style="background-color:#bfb;"
| 160 || September 29 || Padres || 8–0 || Stratton (4–4) || Lyles (1–5) || — || 39,863 || 63–97
|- style="text-align:center" style="background-color:#fbb;"
| 161 || September 30 || Padres || 2–3 || Baumann (2–1) || Dyson (3–4) || Hand (21) || 40,394 || 63–98
|- style="text-align:center" style="background-color:#bfb;"
| 162 || October 1 || Padres || 5–4 || Strickland (3–3) || Maton (3–2) || — || 38,847 || 64–98
|-

Roster

Statistics

Batting
Note: G = Games played; AB = At bats; R = Runs scored; H = Hits; 2B = Doubles; 3B = Triples; HR = Home runs; RBI = Runs batted in; BB = Base on balls; SO = Strikeouts; AVG = Batting average; OPS = On base plus slugging percentage; SB = Stolen bases

Pitching
Note: W = Wins; L = Losses; ERA = Earned run average; G = Games pitched; GS = Games started; SV = Saves; IP = Innings pitched; H = Hits allowed; R = Runs allowed; ER = Earned runs allowed; HR = Home runs allowed; BB = Walks allowed; K = Strikeouts

Awards
Buster Posey won his fourth Silver Slugger Award as the best hitting catcher in the National League.

Farm system

References

External links
 2017 San Francisco Giants season 
 2017 San Francisco Giants season at Baseball Reference

San Francisco Giants
San Francisco Giants seasons
San Francisco Giants